Michael P. Mahoney (March 17, 1842 – April 10, 1925) attempted to assassinate Mayor John Purroy Mitchel of New York City on April 17, 1914.

Biography
He was born March 17, 1842, in York, Ireland. He migrated to the United States in 1865, at the age of 23. He lived in Cincinnati and by 1914 had migrated to New York City.

At 1:30 pm on April 17, 1914, the 71-year-old Mahoney fired his gun at Mitchel as he entering his car to go to lunch. The bullet ricocheted off a pedestrian and hit Frank Lyon Polk, New York City's corporation counsel in the chin.

Mitchel had been armed with a handgun. His predecessor, Mayor William Jay Gaynor, had been shot by a disgruntled former city employee in 1910.

References

1842 births
1925 deaths
American failed assassins